Rogoredo FS is a station on Line 3 of the Milan Metro in Milan, Italy. The station was opened on 12 May 1991 as part of the extension of the line from Porta Romana to San Donato.

The station is located on Via Gian Battista Cassinis, just under the Milano Rogoredo railway station, which is in the municipality of Milan. This is an underground station with two tracks in a single tunnel. It serves the ward of Rogoredo.

References

External links

Line 3 (Milan Metro) stations
Railway stations opened in 2011
2011 establishments in Italy
Railway stations in Italy opened in the 21st century